The hundred of Bucklow  was an ancient division of the historic county of Cheshire, in northern England. It was known to have been in existence at least as early as 1260, and it was formed from the earlier Domesday hundreds of Bochelau and Tunendune.

Courts
Courts, or Eyres, were normally held annually in the region, a week after the close of the county court.  The Justice of Chester presided over the courts, and he would spend several days visiting each hundred in the region.  On 13 October 1445 he held an Eyre at either Middlewich or Northwich for the Buckley and Northwich Hundreds, grouped together for convenience.

Annual tourns were also held by the High Sheriff of Cheshire; on 26 September one such tourn was held for Bucklow Hundred in Hale.

See also
 Hundreds of Cheshire
 Sir Peter Leycester, 1st Baronet

Notes and references

Notes

Bibliography

Hundreds of Cheshire